Marcel Renaud (2 June 1909 – 17 June 1968) was a French racing cyclist who competed in the mid-1920s. He finished fourth in the 4000 m team pursuit event at the 1924 Summer Olympics in Paris.

Renaud's nephew, also named Marcel, won a silver in the C-2 10000 m at the 1956 Summer Olympics in Melbourne. Two of his great-nephews, Eric and Philippe, won bronze medals in canoeing at the Summer Olympics. Eric won his in the C-2 1000 m event at Los Angeles in 1984 while Philippe won his in the C-2 500 m event at Seoul in 1988.

References

External links
 Wallechinsky, David and Jaime Loucky (2008). "Canoeing: Men's Canadian Pairs 1000 Meters". In The Complete Book of the Olympics: 2008 Edition. London: Aurum Press Limited. pp. 481–2.
 
 Marcel Renaud at CyclingArchives

1909 births
1968 deaths
Cyclists at the 1924 Summer Olympics
French male cyclists
Olympic cyclists of France
Cyclists from Paris
French track cyclists